McCreesh is a surname. Notable people with the surname include:

Geoff McCreesh (born 1970), Irish boxer
John McCreesh, American politician
Paul McCreesh (born 1960), English conductor
Raymond McCreesh (1957–1981), Provisional Irish Republican Army member
Thomas McCreesh (1928–2016), American politician